Browns Store is an extinct town in Warren County, Ohio. The location of the townsite is unknown to the GNIS.

A post office called Browns Store was established in 1841, and remained in operation until 1853. Samuel Brown, the first postmaster, gave the community his last name.

References

Ghost towns in Ohio
Landforms of Warren County, Ohio